Chicago Musical College is a division of the Chicago College of Performing Arts  at Roosevelt University.

History

Founding 
Dr. Florenz Ziegfeld Sr (1841–1923), founded the college in 1867 as the Chicago Academy of Music.  The institution has endured without interruption for  years.  Ziegfeld was the father of Florenz Jr., the Broadway impresario.  The Academy was credited as being the fourth conservatory in America. In 1871, the conservatory moved to a new building which was destroyed only a few weeks later by the Great Chicago Fire; despite the conflagration, the college was again up and running by the end of the year.

Name change 
In 1872, the school changed its name to Chicago Musical College (CMC); over 900 students were enrolled in that year. A Normal Teachers' Institute was added to the school's offerings. Tuition in those was an average of one dollar per lesson. Four years later, the State of Illinois accredited the college as a degree granting institution of higher learning. A Preparatory Division was opened which established branches throughout the city.

Rudolph Ganz joined CMC's faculty in 1900 and, except for a brief hiatus in the 1920s, remained associated with the school until his death in 1972. In 1917, CMC offered a Master of Music Degree, and seven years later the school became a charter member of the National Association of Schools of Music.

By 1925, the college moved into its own eleven-story building, Steinway Hall at 64 E. Van Buren Street. One hundred and twenty-five names appeared on the faculty roster for that year, and the school opened three dormitory floors for students. In 1936, CMC was admitted as a full member to the North Central Association of Colleges and Secondary Schools, the only independent music college in the Midwest to enjoy such status. By 1947, the college was offering doctorates in Fine Arts and Music Education.

Merger with Roosevelt University 
In 1954, CMC merged with Roosevelt University's School of Music which had been founded in 1945. The name "Chicago Musical College" was retained for the new united college. All operations moved to join the university in the now national landmark Auditorium Building at 430 South Michigan Avenue in Chicago's Loop. The building houses one of the finest auditoriums in the world, in addition to the Rudolph Ganz Memorial Recital Hall.

Reorganization as a conservatory 
In the fall of 1997, Roosevelt established a College of Performing Arts, which joined Chicago Musical College and the Theater Program under one administrative unit led by founding dean Donald Steven. In 2000, under the leadership of new dean James Gandre, the name was changed to Chicago College of Performing Arts. The college has two divisions: the Music Conservatory and the Theatre Conservatory.

Notable students and faculty

Alumni
 Filip Mitrovic (1979–present), composer 
 Grace Angelau (1899–1958), opera singer
 Clarice Assad (1978–present), composer, pianist 
 Storm Bull (1913–2007), composer, music educator
 Steve Coleman (1956), jazz saxophonist, composer
 Florence Cole Talbert (1890-1961), opera singer, music educator
 Theodore C. Diers, (1880-1942) Wyoming state representative and senator
 Irene Dunne (1898–1990), film actress
 Walter Dyett (1901–1969), violinist, music educator
 Henry Eichheim (1870–1942)
 Vivian Fine (1913–2000), composer
 Floyd Graham (1902–1974), violin, music school educator
 Frances Wilson Grayson (1890–1927), pioneer woman aviator
 Vernice "Bunky" Green (b.1935), jazz saxophonist, jazz educator
 Johnny Hartman (1923-1983), singer
 Willis Laurence James (1900–1966), violinist
 Harriet Lee, radio singer (1920s–1930s) and Hollywood voice teacher
 Ramsey Lewis (1935–2022), jazz pianist, composer
 Lloyd Loar mandolin, violin, viola, singing, composer, acoustics engineer, luthier
 Christine McIntyre (1911-1984), actress and soprano
 Robert McFerrin (1921–2006), operatic baritone 
 Ernestine Myers (1900–1991), dancer, dance educator 
 Prudence Neff (1887–1949), pianist and music teacher 
 Florence Price (1887–1953), composer
 Julia Rebeil (1891–1973), pianist, professor at the University of Arizona
 William Revelli (1902–1994), wind ensemble director, educator
 La Julia Rhea (1898-1992), opera singer
 Silvestre Revueltas (1918-1920) (1922-1924) mexican violinist and composer
 Jim Schwall (b.1942), blues, blues-rock musician, singer/songwriter, Siegel-Schwall Band, Jim Schwall Band
 Corky Siegel (b.1943), blues, blues-rock musician, singer, composer, Siegel-Schwall Band
 Tracy Silverman, violinist, composer
 Frank Skinner (1897–1968)
 Eddie South (1904–1962)
 Eileen Southern (1920–2002), musicologist
Louise Cooper Spindle (1885-1968), composer
 Jule Styne (1905–1994), songwriter
 Jingjing Wang, pianist
 Walter Wenzel, violinist
 Allan Arthur Willman (1909–1989) MM 1930, classical pianist, 20th-century composer, music department chairman
 Ivah Wills Coburn (d. 1937), stage actress and producer
 Aube Tzerko (1909-1995), pianist and mentor, Bachelor's in 1927 from Chicago Musical College under tutelage of Moisseye Boguslawski

Faculty
 Petrowitsch Bissing (1871–1961)
 Rudolph Ganz (1877–1972), pianist, composer
 Goldie Golub (1909-2000), pianist, CMC piano educator for more than 50 years
 Louis Gruenberg (1884–1964), composer
 Wesley LaViolette, influential early jazz educator (1894–1978)
 Fannie B. Linderman (1875-1960), teacher of dramatic arts, entertainer, writer
 Herbert Witherspoon (1873–1935), music history
 Carl Valentin Wunderle (1866–1944), violinist

Historic boards of directors and executive staff 
1896 directors

 Augustus Eugene Bournique (1842–1926)
 William Melancton Hoyt (1837–1926)
 Alexander Hamilton Revell Sr. (1858–1931)
 The Reverend Hiram Washington Thomas, D.D. (1832–1909)
 Hon. Richard S. Tuthill (1841–1920)
 Carl O. Ziegfeld (1869–1921)
 Dr. Florenz Ziegfeld (1841–1923)
 William Kimball Ziegfeld (1872–1927)

1896 executive staff
 Alfred M. Snydacker (1858–1929), corporate secretary
 Carl O. Ziegfeld (1869–1921), business manager 
 Dr. Florenz Ziegfeld (1841–1923), president 
 William K. Ziegfeld (1872–1927), associate manager

References

Educational institutions established in 1867
Music schools in Illinois
Roosevelt University
1867 establishments in Illinois